Buckbee, Wisconsin is an unincorporated community in the Town of Larrabee, Waupaca County, Wisconsin.

Transportation

History
The community is named for J.E. Buckbee, a Union colonel in the American Civil War.

Notes

Unincorporated communities in Wisconsin
Unincorporated communities in Waupaca County, Wisconsin